Arunai Engineering College (AEC) is a private college located in Thiruvannaamalai, Tamil Nadu, India.

AEC was founded in 1993 by Thiru E. V. Velu, on behalf of the Saraswathi Ammal Educational Trust. The college is located on the Chittor - Cuddalore national highway spreading over 31.5 acres

The college has been lauded by India's top magazine Frontline for shaping the face of education in Tamil Nadu.

History

Initial years
In 1993 the college was granted permission to conduct engineering courses in the disciplines of mechanical engineering, electrical and electronics engineering and computer science engineering, awarded by the University of Madras and approved by the AICTE

Expansion
In subsequent years the college has started courses like biotechnology, chemical engineering, computer applications (masters), electronics and communication engineering, information technology.

Courses offered

Undergraduate

Bachelor of Engineering
 Civil Engineering
 Computer Science Engineering
 Electrical and Electronics Engineering
 Electronics and Communication Engineering
 Electronics and Instrumentation Engineering
 Mechanical Engineering

Bachelor of Technology
 Biotechnology
 Chemical Engineering
 Information Technology

Postgraduate
 Biotechnology
 Computer Science
 Applied Electronics
 Network Engineering
 Power Electronics & Drives
 Embedded System Technologies
 CAD/CAM
Structural Engineering
 Thermal Engineering

Master of Business administration
MBA

Co-curricular activities
Co-Curricular activities are very much encouraged in Arunai Engineering College. Every department conduct respective Symposiums, workshops and seminars annually. They are also involved in research work.

The department of biotechnology is an active participant in various research activities that take place in the world of Biotechnology. The department is actively engaged in quality life science education and is ranked among top private biotech schools in India by Biospectrum magazine.

Facilities

Library
The library spans two floors containing more than 30,000 volumes of books with topics related to arts, science, engineering, technology and Management. The college subscribes to more than 250 Indian and international journals. Both the floors are air-conditioned with facilities for Internet usage, reprography, a media library as well as a book bank.

In addition to the Central Library, all departments have dedicated libraries.

Awards and accolades
The students of the college have won awards in competitions and conferences around India. In October 2011, the students of AEC received four awards at the National level ISTE conference held at Jayam Engineering College, Dharmapuri.

In the 2012 annual ISTE convention held at Sanjay Ghodawat Group of Institutions, Kohlapur, Maharashtra, the projects developed by students of Arunai Engineering College were awarded. A majority of students from the college also visited the event and won prizes in various events including Paper Presentation and others.

The IEEE Association website of the college has been awarded second place for the best design in the Asia-pacific region. As a stipend, they also received US$350.

References

Engineering colleges in Tamil Nadu
Education in Tiruvannamalai district
Tiruvannamalai